The Golden Arches are the symbol of McDonald's, the global fast food restaurant chain. Originally, real arches were part of the restaurant design. They were incorporated into the chain's logo in 1962, which resembled a stylized restaurant, and in the current Golden Arches logo, introduced 1968, resembling an "M" for "McDonald's". They are widely regarded to be one of the most recognizable logos in the world.

History
In 1952, brothers Richard and Maurice McDonald decided they needed a new building to house their hamburger restaurant in San Bernardino, California. They wanted this building to have an entirely new design which would achieve two goals: even greater efficiency, and an eye-catching appearance. They interviewed at least four architects altogether, finally choosing Stanley Clark Meston, an architect practicing in nearby Fontana, in late 1952. The arches had a direct bearing on the interviewing process and their choice of Meston: the first architect they interviewed objected to the arches the brothers wanted; a second wanted to change the arches; a third, prominent Los Angeles architect Douglas Honnold, said that if the brothers were going to tell him what to do they would be better off doing it themselves.

Along with their practical knowledge, the brothers brought Meston a rough sketch of two half-circle arches drawn by Richard. The idea of an arch had struck Richard as a memorable shape to make their stand more visible. After considering one arch parallel to the front of the building, he had sketched two half-circles on either side of the stand. Meston, together with his assistant Charles Fish, responded with a design which included two  yellow sheet-metal arches trimmed in neon, called "golden arches" even at the design stage. His design also included a third, smaller arch sign at the roadside with a pudgy character in a chef's hat, known as Speedee, striding across the top, trimmed in animated neon.

According to architectural historian Alan Hess, "Meston and Fish turned the crude half-circle suggested by Richard McDonald's sketch into a tapered, sophisticated parabola, with tense, springing lines conveying movement and energy." In the same article Hess added this footnote: "Who first suggested the parabola is unclear. Richard McDonald and George Dexter, the sign contractor who fabricated the first arches, recalled that Dexter came up with the idea and added them to the plans. Charles Fish, who did the working drawings and aided Meston in the design, attributes the idea to his familiarity with the form from a school project in which he used structural parabolas for a hangar. The form was one of many advanced engineering solutions, including folded plate roofs, that were in common currency."

The first franchised outlet bearing Meston's design opened in May 1953 in Phoenix, Arizona. Subsequent franchisees of the McDonald brothers were also required to use Meston's design, although Meston adapted the plans for each to the conditions and building codes of each site.

In 1962, seeking to upgrade its image, the company sought a new logo. Fred Turner sketched a stylized "V", but the company's head of engineering and design, Jim Schindler, extended the "V" into an "M" resembling a McDonald's store viewed from an angle, with a red isosceles trapezoid "roof" serving as background for lettering.

While , the Golden Arches have remained in the logo, and as a commonly understood term for the company. This was partially due to Louis Cheskin's argument that the arches, which he likened to "mother McDonald's breasts", had "Freudian applications to the subconscious mind of the consumer and were great assets in marketing McDonald's food." 

Alan Hess summarized the arch's origin in Googie architecture and ultimate significance as follows:

Variations

All restaurants operated by McDonald's Canada use a variation of the Golden Arches, which features a maple leaf inserted into the centre of the Golden Arches; subsuming a Canadian national symbol into its corporate symbol.

The McDonald's arches in Sedona, Arizona were made turquoise when the yellow color had been deemed by government officials to be contrasting too much against the scenic red rock.

As of 2019, seven McDonald's signs only have one arch, including locations in Magnolia, New Jersey; Winter Haven, Florida; Montrose, Colorado; and McDonald's sign in Pine Bluff, Arkansas.

The McDonald's restaurant at 610 Del Monte Ave., Monterey, California, has black arches.

The McDonald's in North Scottsdale, Arizona on 18241 N Pima Rd also has black arches.

The McDonald's restaurant at 2172 Sunset Blvd. in Rocklin, CA has dark red arches.

The restaurant at Champs-Elysées in Paris, France, includes a neon McDonald's sign with white arches. Also, a recently built McDonald's in Bruges, Belgium, has white arches.

In 2018 and again in 2019, McDonald's turned the arches upside down on its social media accounts in celebration of International Women's Day, changing the "M" to a "W."  A McDonald's franchise operated by Patricial Williams in Lynwood, California, also flipped the arches on its sign.  This prompted a mild backlash, with some arguing that the move was hypocritical due to the chain's underpaying of employees, and others observing that the "M" in the logo could just as easily stand for "men" as it could for "McDonald's."

Influence

The term "Golden Arches" is sometimes used as metonym, symbolizing capitalism or globalization in phrases such as the "Golden Arches Theory of Conflict Prevention", which holds that "No two countries that both had McDonald's had fought a war against each other since each got its McDonald's". McDonald's Golden Arches is used as it is one of the more prominent American corporations that have become global in their reach (along with Coca-Cola and Nike).

The shape and color of the prominent space frame trusses used in the heavy-lift ship VB-10,000 have led some to nickname it the "Golden Arches".

References

External links

McDonald's
Commercial logos
Yellow symbols
Symbols introduced in 1962
Monograms